The Division of Tangney is an Australian electoral division in the state of Western Australia. The Division was named after Dame Dorothy Tangney, the first female member of the Australian Senate.

Tangney is an affluent electorate covering the southern shores of the Swan and Canning rivers, divided by the Kwinana Freeway. It extends from Bicton to Riverton and Ferndale and as far south as Murdoch, Leeming and Canning Vale. Tangney covers 102 sq. kilometers.

From the 1980s to 2022 it was considered a safe Liberal seat and in 2022 was held by Ben Morton, a former state director of the Liberal Party. In the 2022 Australian federal election, Sam Lim, the Labor candidate garnered a 10.4 per cent swing against the sitting member to deliver Tangney to the ALP for the first time since 1983.

History

Tangney was established at the Western Australia redistribution of 19 April 1974 and was first contested at the 1974 election. Before the 1984 redistribution, the electorate included the traditional Labor areas of Spearwood and Gosnells, and was a bellwether seat for the party in government. After 1984, the seat received its present borders. For most of the next three decades, it was a safe Liberal seat.

It was first held by John Dawkins, later a Treasurer of Australia (as Member for Fremantle), and was held from 1993 until 2004 by Daryl Williams, former Attorney-General of Australia and Rhodes Scholar.

The seat briefly made national headlines in August 2006 when Matt Brown, once a chief-of-staff to former Defence Minister Robert Hill, defeated incumbent Dennis Jensen for preselection, despite support for the latter from John Howard. However, on 7 October 2006, the decision was overturned by the Liberals' Western Australian state council and Jensen was once again confirmed as the candidate for the 2007 election.

Jensen lost Liberal preselection in Tangney for the 2016 federal election. Announced on 3 April 2016, it was revealed he had written an unpublished book that included a sex scene, subsequently published as an e-book. Former party state director Ben Morton won preselection. On 2 July 2016 Ben Morton won the Tangney seat with 61.5% of the vote, losing 1.5% towards the Labor Party.

At the 2022 federal election, Morton lost over 10.5 percent of his primary vote, and Labor candidate Sam Lim defeated Morton on Green preferences. Lim picked up a swing of over 11 percent amid the Liberals' collapse in Western Australia.

Geography
Since 1984, federal electoral division boundaries in Australia have been determined at redistributions by a redistribution committee appointed by the Australian Electoral Commission. Redistributions occur for the boundaries of divisions in a particular state, and they occur every seven years, or sooner if a state's representation entitlement changes or when divisions of a state are malapportioned.

In August 2021, the Australian Electoral Commission (AEC) announced Tangney would gain the Canning suburb of Wilson from the seat of Swan and the Canning-Gosnells suburb of Canning Vale from the seat of Burt. These boundary changes took place at the 2022 election.

The seat presently contains most of the City of Melville, a part of the City of Canning and a small portion of the City of Cockburn and is located south of the Swan and Canning rivers. Suburbs presently included are:

City of Melville

 Alfred Cove 
 Applecross 
 Ardross 
 Attadale 
 Bateman 
 Bicton 
 Booragoon 
 Brentwood 
 Bull Creek 
 Kardinya (part)
 Leeming (part)
 Melville 
 Mount Pleasant 
 Murdoch
 Myaree 
 Willagee 
 Winthrop 

City of Canning
 
 Canning Vale
 Ferndale 
 Lynwood 
 Parkwood 
 Riverton 
 Rossmoyne 
 Shelley 
 Willetton
 Wilson

City of Cockburn

 Leeming (part)

Members

Election results

References

External links
 Division of Tangney - Australian Electoral Commission

Electoral divisions of Australia
Constituencies established in 1974
1974 establishments in Australia